United Tractor was an American manufacturer of tractors and aircraft tugs located in Chesterton, Indiana.

History 
United Tractor and Material Handling Equipment Company was founded by United States Army Air Force veteran George A. Sivore in Hammond, Indiana in 1960 as a division of the United Boiler Heating and Foundry Company. 
By 1962, it had become United Tractor, Inc. and that year it moved to Chesterton, Indiana.

The company was sold to American Industries Corporation in 1968, which then changed its name to United Tractor & Equipment Company. The name would be changed again in 1971 to United Tractor Company.

By 1982, it had been purchased by Wedge Products.

In 1988, the company purchased Kalamazoo Manufacturing.

United Tractor signed a deal to build Clark tow tractors in 1995. The agreement also saw the latter's products sold through United distributors.

The company received a grant from the Indiana Department of Commerce in 1997 to improve the energy management system at its factory.

The company moved to Twinsburg, Ohio in 1999. In 2002, it was renamed AJD Tractor, Inc. It was dissolved in 2004.

Products 

 CB-40
 G40
 GC-340
 SM40
 SM50
 SM60
 SM340
 SML-80
 SML-100
 SML-120
 TA-75

References

Notes

Bibliography 
 
 

Tractor manufacturers of the United States
American companies established in 1971
Manufacturing companies based in Indiana
Manufacturing companies based in Ohio